Henning Schulze was an East German luger who competed in the mid-1970s. He won a silver medal in the men's doubles event at the 1974 FIL World Luge Championships in Königssee, West Germany.

References
Hickok sports information on World champions in luge and skeleton.
SportQuick.com information on World champions in luge 

German male lugers
Possibly living people
Year of birth missing
20th-century German people